Decoded Neurofeedback (DecNef) is the process of inducing knowledge in a subject by increasing neural activation in predetermined regions in the brain, such as the visual cortex. This is achieved by measuring neural activity in these regions via functional magnetic resonance imaging (FMRI), comparing this to the ideal pattern of neural activation in these regions (for the intended purpose), and giving subjects feedback on how close their current pattern of neural activity is to the ideal pattern. Without explicit knowledge of what they are supposed to be doing or thinking about, over time participants learn to induce this ideal pattern of neural activation. Corresponding to this, their 'knowledge' or way of thinking has been found to change accordingly.

Experiments conducted in 2011 at Boston University (BU) and ATR Computational Neuroscience Laboratories in Kyoto, Japan demonstrated that volunteers were able to quickly solve complex visual puzzles they had not previously had exposure to. They did so by receiving the brain patterns of other volunteers who had already learned to solve the puzzles through trial and error methods.

The research has far-reaching implications for treating patients with various learning disabilities, mental illness, memory problems, and motor functionality impairments.

External links 
  National Science Foundation: Vision Scientists Demonstrate Innovative Learning Method
  Science Magazine: Perceptual Learning Incepted by Decoded fMRI Neurofeedback Without Stimulus Presentation

Neuroscience